December 2016 Jakarta protests, also known as 212 Action, the 3rd Defend Islam Action, and the 2 December Peace Protest, was a mass protest led by Islamist groups which took place on 2 December 2016, in Jakarta, Indonesia. During the protest, marchers demanded the termination of the gubernatorial office held by Basuki Tjahaja Purnama (Ahok), who had been accused of blasphemy. The protest was the second demonstration against Ahok in 2016 following the previous rally which took place on 4 November, and it was succeeded by the February 2017 Jakarta protests.

Background

The incumbent governor of Jakarta, Basuki Tjahaja Purnama, who was contesting for the forthcoming 2017 Jakarta gubernatorial election, was accused of blasphemy against Islam following his speech on 27 September 2016. National outcry against his perceived misdemeanor had triggered a small scale protest on 14 October and a nationwide protest in November 2016, the later reported widely among the international media. Many considered it a crisis of democracy and conservatism among Islam in Indonesia. Facing the counter-protest by the pro-Ahok groups on 30 November, the oppositions and Islamist groups jointly planned for an even wider scale and more inclusive protest.

Protest

Initially, the protest was planned to be held on 25 November 2016 but then it was agreed to be held on 2 December. The National Movement of Fatwa Guards - Majelis Ulama Indonesia (GNPF-MUI), the main organizer of the 4 November protest, said it would hold a similar action again on 2 December 2016. The leader of Islamic Defenders Front (FPI), Muhammad Rizieq Shihab  said that this action would take place with the extra commitment for nonviolence as it will be held in the form of joint worship. This statement received mixed responses. The chairman of the House of Representatives, Ade Komaruddin chose not to respond to the statement and requested reporters to ask directly to the organizers. The police chief Tito Karnavian threatened not to issue permission for the action upon fear of going violent. After an agreement between the organizers and the police, the action was agreed to take place with activities in the form of praying and the joint performance of Friday prayers.

The protest was held at the Merdeka Square surrounding the National Monument in Central Jakarta. The number of attendees ranged from 200,000 (police claims) to 7.5 millions (organizers' claims). From video evidence scattered across various social media and video sharing websites via drone camera, it can be seen that the mass extends to the main road of Hotel Indonesia Roundabout. During the protest, a number of activities were carried out, including praying and joint Friday prayers. The president of Indonesia Joko Widodo attended the event and was warmly welcomed by the participants. Among the celebrities who joined the protest, there were Ardian Syaf, the prominent Indonesian comic artist, and Wijayanto, the pop Islamic preacher. Other prominent figures who joined the protest includes Hidayat Nur Wahid, deputy chairman of the House of Representatives.

Aftermath
Basuki later lost the elections to Anies Baswedan and was found guilty, being sentenced to 2 years on 9 May 2017. On the protests' anniversary, a “reunion” was held in the same location.

The Sharia minimarket co-operative 212 Mart, setup in May 2017 was named in honour of the protests, and by August 2018 had 192 stores.

The event was later depicted in a 2018 movie, 212: The Power of Love.

In 2020, shortly after Muhammad Rizieq Shihab’s return to Indonesia, local police stated that they are not giving permits for the group to gather for a reunion due to the COVID-19 pandemic; should they do such, they are at risk of being disbanded.

See also

2016–17 Jakarta protests

References 

2016 in Indonesia
2016 protests
Protests in Indonesia
December 2016 events in Indonesia
2010s in Jakarta
Persecution of Christians in Indonesia